The state-transition equation is defined as the solution of the linear homogeneous state equation. The linear time-invariant state equation given by

with state vector x, control vector u, vector w of additive disturbances, and fixed matrices A, B, and E, can be solved by using either the classical method of solving linear differential equations or the Laplace transform method. The Laplace transform solution is presented in the following equations.
The Laplace transform of the above equation yields 

Solving for  gives

So, the state-transition equation can be obtained by taking inverse Laplace transform as 

In the study of control systems, specially discrete-data control systems, it is often desirable to break up a state-transition process into a sequence of transitions, so a more flexible initial time must be chosen.

Once the state-transition equation is determined, the output vector can be expressed as a function of the initial state.

See also
 Control theory
 Control engineering
 Automatic control
Feedback
Process control
PID loop

External links
 Control System Toolbox for design and analysis of control systems.
 http://web.mit.edu/2.14/www/Handouts/StateSpaceResponse.pdf
 Wikibooks:Control Systems/State-Space Equations
 http://planning.cs.uiuc.edu/node411.html

Control theory